The Pentecostal Free Will Baptist Church (PFWBC) is a church group in the southern United States, best thought of as Pentecostal rather than Baptist. The PFWBC is historically and theologically a combination of both, having begun as a small group of churches in North Carolina that broke away from the Free Will Baptist Church to join the Holiness movement and eventually accepting certain Pentecostal doctrines.

History
Paul Palmer ministered in the Carolinas in the first half of the 18th century. He established a church in 1727 in Chowan, North Carolina. The southern branch of Free Will Baptists are largely the fruit of his labor. Many of these "Palmer" churches cooperated to form the National Association of Free Will Baptists in 1935. 

Reverend G. B. Cashwell (1862-1916), a former minister of the Methodist Episcopal Church, South, returned to North Carolina after experiencing what he felt to be the baptism of the Holy Spirit in 1906 at the Azusa Street Revival. He began preaching "pentecost" to the Holiness denominations there, one of which was this small group of former Free Will Baptists.  Through a series of meetings he held, beginning in 1906, this group accepted points of Pentecostal faith and practice. Cashwell's own group was the Pentecostal Holiness Church (now known as the International Pentecostal Holiness Church). The Pentecostal Free Will Baptist Church was formed from these groups in 1959.

Doctrine
The doctrine is a mixture of Baptist (specifically, Free Will Baptist) and Pentecostal beliefs. Sanctification as a second work of grace, baptism of the Holy Ghost as evidenced by speaking in tongues, and the supernatural move of the Holy Spirit are important aspects of the Pentecostal Free Will Baptist denomination. A General Meeting is held biannually. Headquarters are in Dunn, North Carolina, where Heritage Bible College was started in 1971.

Membership
In 1998, the PFWBC had an estimated 28,000 members in 150 churches. In addition to the majority of churches in eastern North Carolina, there are also churches in Virginia, South Carolina and Florida, as well as overseas missions.

Though the Pentecostal Free Will Baptist Church recognizes its Baptist heritage, its advance and choice of fellowship has been Pentecostal, shown, for example, by its membership in the Pentecostal/Charismatic Churches of North America (formerly the Pentecostal Fellowship of North America).

Prominent members
David R. Lewis, former Representative in the North Carolina House of Representatives

Sources
Encyclopedia of Religion in the South, Samuel S. Hill, editor
Handbook of Denominations (11th Edition), by Frank S. Mead, Samuel S. Hill, and Craig D. Atwood

References

External links

Christian organizations established in 1959
Baptist denominations in North America
Pentecostal denominations in North America
Baptist denominations established in the 20th century
Holiness denominations
1906 establishments in North Carolina